Paradise FC  may refer to:

Paradise FC (Barbados), a football team from Barbados
Paradise FC International, a football team from Grenada